Ligeria is a genus of flies in the family Tachinidae.

Species
L. angusticornis (Loew, 1847)
L. latigena Wood, 1985
L. rostrata Herting, 1971

References

Diptera of Europe
Diptera of North America
Exoristinae
Tachinidae genera
Taxa named by Jean-Baptiste Robineau-Desvoidy